The men's freestyle middleweight was a Catch as Catch Can wrestling, later freestyle, event held as part of the wrestling at the 1920 Summer Olympics programme. It was the second appearance of the event. Middleweight was the median category, and included wrestlers weighing up to 69 kilograms.

A total of 18 wrestlers from twelve nations competed in the event, which was held from Wednesday, August 25 to Friday, August 27, 1920.

Results

References

External links
 
 
 

Wrestling at the 1920 Summer Olympics